Satish Kumar is an Indian footballer who is currently playing for Bangalore Independents in the Bangalore Super Division as a midfielder.

References

External links
 http://mohunbaganac.com/SEPT08/news_details.php?newsid=633
 http://mohunbaganac.com/SEPT08/playerdetails.php?playerId=121

1988 births
Living people
Indian footballers
I-League players
Footballers from Bangalore
Association football midfielders
Mohun Bagan AC players